Mario Marcell Haggan (born March 3, 1980) is a former American football linebacker who played in the National Football League (NFL) for the Buffalo Bills, the Denver Broncos, and St. Louis Rams. He was drafted by the Bills in the seventh round of the 2003 NFL Draft after playing college football at Mississippi State.

Early years
Haggan grew up in Clarksdale, Mississippi, where he attended Clarksdale High School, played football and was named an All-American. He was named first-team all-state by the Jackson Clarion-Ledger and played in the Mississippi/Alabama All-Star Game. Haggan led his team to the state Class 4A championship in 1997. As a senior, he recorded 158 tackles with three fumble recoveries and earned Honorable Mention All-American honors from USA Today.

College career
Haggan played at Mississippi State from 1998-2002 playing both linebacker and defensive end. Haggan was a member of the Bulldogs’ 1998 SEC Western Division championship squad as well as the 10-win 1999 team that led the nation in defense.  During his time at MSU the Bulldogs played in the SEC Championship Game, the Cotton Bowl, the Peach Bowl, and the Independence Bowl.  Haggan was a first-team All-SEC selection by the Associated Press and second-team All-America honoree by The Sporting News in 2000 and a second-team All-SEC selection in both 2001 and 2002.  He was the Bulldogs’ leading tackler in each of his last three seasons, including 119 tackles his senior season and ranks eighth in MSU history with 359 total tackles.

Professional career

Buffalo Bills
Haggan was drafted in the seventh round of the 2003 draft by the Buffalo Bills, playing in 65 games for the Bills while collecting 78 tackles from 2003-2007.

Denver Broncos

In 2008, Haggan was signed by the Denver Broncos. Haggan was named a starting OLB and a defensive captain for 2009 and started all 16 games that year. In 2010, he was moved to ILB and delivered the best season of his career, with 87 tackles in 16 more starts. Haggan was one of only two Bronco players to start every game in 2009 and 2010. Haggan was valued by the Broncos as a depth player for his versatility, having played all three linebacker positions and both defensive end positions.

St. Louis Rams
Haggan signed with the Rams on May 15, 2012. During his one season with the Rams he played in 11 games, registering 11 tackles, one forced fumble and one fumble recovery.

During his 10-year NFL career, Haggan had 283 tackles and eight forced fumbles in 132 games.

Personal
He is married to Tanika Haggan who was a volleyball player at Mississippi State and also served as a business education teacher and volleyball coach at Rowlett High School in Rowlett, Texas.

References

External links
Denver Broncos bio

1980 births
Living people
Sportspeople from Clarksdale, Mississippi
American football linebackers
Mississippi State Bulldogs football players
Buffalo Bills players
Denver Broncos players
St. Louis Rams players